A general election was held in the state of New South Wales, Australia, on Saturday 7 October 1978. The result was  a landslide victory for the Labor Party under Neville Wran, popularly known as the "Wranslide."

It is notable for being so successful for the Labor Party that it tallied 57 percent of the primary vote, the largest primary vote for any party in over a century.  Having gone into the election with a razor-thin majority of one seat, Labor scored a 13-seat swing, giving it a strong majority of 63 seats.  Labor even managed to defeat the Leader of the Opposition, Peter Coleman, in his own electorate.  The seats of many other prominent Shadow Ministers fell to Labor as well. Labor also won took many seats in areas long reckoned as Coalition heartland.  Among them were four seats that Labor had never won before this election--Willoughby (contested for the Liberal Party by Nick Greiner who later became Premier), Manly, Wakehurst and Cronulla. It also came within striking distance of taking several more. For instance, it pared down the margin in Pittwater, the seat of former premier Bob Askin, to only 1.4 percent.

The state's first elections to the New South Wales Legislative Council, the state parliament's upper house, were held simultaneously. Voters had approved a referendum to introduce a directly elected council in June of that year.

The election was also the first in the state to be contested by the Australian Democrats.

Labor continued to campaign heavily on the strengths of Wran himself, with the slogan "Wran's our man".

Key dates

Results

Legislative Assembly

{{Australian elections/Title row
| table style = float:right;clear:right;margin-left:1em;
| title        = New South Wales state election, 7 October 1978
| house        = Legislative Assembly
| series       = New South Wales state election
| back         = 1976
| forward      = 1981
| enrolled     = 3,085,661
| total_votes  = 2,862,616
| turnout %    = 92.77
| turnout chg  = –0.52
| informal     = 65,274
| informal %   = 2.28
| informal chg = +0.52
}}
	

|}

{{ bar box |float=right| title=Popular vote | titlebar=#ddd | width=600px | barwidth=410px | bars= 

}}

Legislative Council

{{Australian elections/Title row
| table style = float:right;clear:right;margin-left:1em;
| title        = New South Wales state election, 7 October 1978
| house        = Legislative Council
| staggered    = yes
| enrolled     = 3,085,661
| total_votes  = 2,862,616
| turnout %    = 92.77
| turnout chg  =  
| informal     = 115,995
| informal %   = 4.05
| informal chg =  
}}
	

|}

The final 2 party preferred result was 60.7% for Labor and 39.3% for the Coalition, making it one of the biggest landslide victories in New South Wales's electoral history. In 2PP terms it was a 9.1% swing to Labor from the Coalition. This was beaten by the Coalition's result of 64.2% and 35.8% for Labor in the 2011 election.  However, Labor's record primary vote of 57.7 percent still stands today.

Seats changing hands

 Members listed in italics did not recontest their seats.

Post-election pendulum

See also
Candidates of the 1978 New South Wales state election

Notes

References

Sources cited
 

Elections in New South Wales
1978 elections in Australia
1970s in New South Wales
October 1978 events in Australia